Joseph Nathan Mickles (born December 25, 1965) is a former American football running back.  He played in the National Football League (NFL) for the Washington Redskins in 1989 NFL season and the San Diego Chargers in the 1990 season.  He played college football at the University of Mississippi from 1985 to 1988 and scored a touchdown in the team's 20-17 win over Texas Tech in the 1986 Independence Bowl.  He was drafted in the twelfth round of the 1989 NFL Draft.

References

1965 births
Living people
American football running backs
Barcelona Dragons players
Hamburg Sea Devils coaches
Ole Miss Rebels football players
Players of American football from Birmingham, Alabama
San Diego Chargers players
Scottish Claymores players
Washington Redskins players